Ojaq Kandi (also Romanized as Ojāq Kandī) is a village in Bastamlu Rural District, in the Central District of Khoda Afarin County, East Azerbaijan Province, Iran. At the 2006 census, its population was 513, in 101 families.

References 

Populated places in Khoda Afarin County